Piedras Blancas Light Station is located at Point Piedras Blancas, about  west by northwest of San Simeon, California. It was added to the California Coastal National Monument in 2017.

History and management 
The first-order Fresnel lens at Piedras Blancas was first illuminated on February 15, 1875. The lens was moved and is on display in the nearby community of Cambria.  
A sound signal was added in 1906.

In 1939, management was transferred from the United States Lighthouse Service to the United States Coast Guard. In 1975, the light was automated, the sound signal removed, and the light station was unmanned. A group of biologists with the U.S. Fish and Wildlife Service received permission to establish a biological research station in 1977. In 2001, the Bureau of Land Management (BLM) assumed management of the site and was tasked to offer structured public access, allow site-specific research to continue, and restore the light station to its period of greatest historical significance (1875 to 1940). The Piedras Blancas Light Station Association is a non-profit partner of the BLM, helping to raise funds for restoration and maintenance.

The lighthouse continues to serve as an aid to navigation. A Vega VRB-25 produces a flash every 10 seconds. The light station is managed as a historic park and wildlife sanctuary.

The Piedras Blancas Historic Light Station was designated as an Outstanding Natural Area in 2008.

Access 
Access to the  site is by guided tours, available every Tuesday, Thursday, and Saturday (except federal holidays) year round. From June 15 through August 31, tours are offered Mondays through Saturdays (except federal holidays). The fee is $10 for adults; $5 for ages 6 to 17; and free for ages 5 and under. Special tours for parties of 10 or more may be arranged. The tour lasts two hours and includes the historic lighthouse and support buildings, wildlife viewing, and spectacular scenery along an easy half-mile interpretive trail.

Elephant seal rookery and marine protected areas
The largest elephant seal rookery on the West Coast is located about a mile south of the lighthouse along California Highway One. A few animals began using the rookery in 1990. A large parking area and boardwalk offer easy access to view the elephant seals. Docents from Friends of the Elephant Seal provide insight as to what the visitor is viewing. Open year-round.

Piedras Blancas State Marine Reserve and Marine Conservation Area are marine protected areas offshore from Piedras Blancas Light Station. Like underwater parks, these marine protected areas help conserve ocean wildlife and marine ecosystems.

In popular culture
The 1959 movie The Monster of Piedras Blancas was not shot at Point Piedras Blancas. The lighthouse locations in the movie were filmed at the Point Conception Light lighthouse near Lompoc, and the town is the seaside town of Cayucos, about 30 miles south of Piedras Blancas.

Gallery

See also

 List of lighthouses in the United States
Rancho Piedra Blanca, old Mexican land grant that included Point Piedras Blancas
Piedras Blancas Motel, vintage roadside motel near the lighthouse

References

Further reading
Point Piedras Blancas, by  Carole Adams  & John Bogacki. 2008, Arcadia "Images of America" series.

External links

 Piedras Blancas Light Station Outstanding Natural Area, Bureau of Land Management 
 Piedras Blancas Light Station Association

Lighthouses completed in 1875
Lighthouses on the National Register of Historic Places in California
National Register of Historic Places in San Luis Obispo County, California
Buildings and structures in San Luis Obispo County, California
Protected areas of San Luis Obispo County, California
Bureau of Land Management areas in California
Gothic Revival architecture in California
Neoclassical architecture in California
Historic districts on the National Register of Historic Places in California